Thomas Howard, 1st Earl of Berkshire (8 October 1587 – 16 July 1669) was an English politician who sat in the House of Commons between 1605 and 1622. He was created Earl of Berkshire in 1626.

Life

Howard was born in Saffron Walden, Essex, the second son of Thomas Howard, 1st Earl of Suffolk and his wife Catherine Knyvet. He was educated at Magdalene College, Cambridge. He was knighted in 1604. In 1605 he was elected Member of Parliament for Lancaster in a by-election. He was elected MP for Wiltshire in 1614. In 1621 he was elected MP for Cricklade. In 1621 he was created Baron Howard of Charlton, Wiltshire and on 7 February 1626, he was created Earl of Berkshire. He inherited the Charlton Park estate in Wiltshire from his mother.

During the English Civil War  he was a Royalist, but after the defeat of the Royalist cause Parliament left him in peace. Edward Hyde, 1st Earl of Clarendon, who despised Berkshire, said that this was because he had no reputation and no understanding of public affairs, and so could do Parliament's cause no harm. After the Restoration of Charles II he was made a Gentleman of the Bedchamber.

Family
Howard married Elizabeth Cecil, daughter and co-heir of William Cecil, 2nd Earl of Exeter in 1614. They had thirteen children:
 Charles Howard, 2nd Earl of Berkshire (1615–1679).
 Mary Howard (1616–1679)
 Thomas Howard, 3rd Earl of Berkshire (1619–1706).
 Henry Howard (playwright)
 William Howard, Grandfather of 11th Earl of Suffolk and 4th of Berkshire
 Sir Robert Howard (1626–1698)
 Elizabeth Howard, married John Dryden
 Colonel Philip Howard (1629–1717)
 Frances Howard, who married Conyers Darcy, 2nd Earl of Holderness
 James Howard
 Algernon Howard
 Edward Howard
 Diana Howard (1636–1713).

References

 

|-

|-

|-

1587 births
1669 deaths
Alumni of Magdalene College, Cambridge
Thomas
Thomas Howard, 01st Earl of Berkshire
Knights of the Garter
Lord-Lieutenants of Middlesex
Lord-Lieutenants of Oxfordshire
People from Saffron Walden
Members of the Parliament of England (pre-1707) for Wiltshire
17th-century English nobility
English MPs 1604–1611
English MPs 1614
English MPs 1621–1622
Members of the Parliament of England (pre-1707) for Cricklade
Younger sons of earls